Verna Burnard (born 19 August 1956) is an Australian sprinter. She competed in the women's 400 metres and 4x400 metres at the 1976 Summer Olympics.

References

External links
 

1956 births
Living people
Athletes (track and field) at the 1976 Summer Olympics
Australian female sprinters
Olympic athletes of Australia
Place of birth missing (living people)
Olympic female sprinters
20th-century Australian women